The Mamluk Sultanate, also known as Mamluk Egypt or the Mamluk Empire, was a state that ruled Egypt, the Levant and the Hejaz (western Arabia) from the mid-13th to early 16th centuries. It was ruled by a military caste of mamluks (manumitted slave soldiers) headed by the sultan. The Abbasid caliphs were the nominal sovereigns. The sultanate was established with the overthrow of the Ayyubid dynasty in Egypt in 1250 and was conquered by the Ottoman Empire in 1517. Mamluk history is generally divided into the Turkic or Bahri period (1250–1382) and the Circassian or Burji period (1382–1517), called after the predominant ethnicity or corps of the ruling Mamluks during these respective eras.

The first rulers of the sultanate hailed from the mamluk regiments of the Ayyubid sultan as-Salih Ayyub, usurping power from his successor in 1250. The Mamluks under Sultan Qutuz and Baybars routed the Mongols in 1260, halting their southward expansion. They then conquered or gained suzerainty over the Ayyubids' Syrian principalities. By the end of the 13th century, through the efforts of sultans Baybars, Qalawun and al-Ashraf Khalil, they conquered the Crusader states, expanded into Makuria (Nubia), Cyrenaica, the Hejaz and southern Anatolia. The sultanate then experienced a long period of stability and prosperity during the third reign of al-Nasir Muhammad (r. 1293–1294, 1299–1309, 1310–1341), before giving way to the internal strife characterizing the succession of his sons, when real power was held by senior emirs.

One such emir, Barquq, overthrew the sultan in 1390, inaugurating Burji rule. Mamluk authority across the empire eroded under his successors due to foreign invasions, tribal rebellions, and natural disasters, and the state entered into a long period of financial distress. Under Sultan Barsbay major efforts were taken to replenish the treasury, particularly monopolization of trade with Europe and tax expeditions into the countryside.

Name
The term 'Mamluk Sultanate' is a modern historiographical term. Arabic sources for the period of the Bahri Mamluks refer to the dynasty as the 'State of the Turks' (Dawlat al-Atrak or Dawlat al-Turk) or 'State of Turkey' (al-Dawla al-Turkiyya). The other official name was 'State of the Circassians' (Dawlat al-Jarakisa) during Burji rule. A variant thereof (al-Dawla al-Turkiyya al-Jarakisiyya) emphasized the fact that the Circassians were Turkic-speaking.

Mamluk sultans were known as Sultans of Egypt and Syria.

History

Origins 

The mamluk was an "owned slave", distinguished from the ghulam, or household slave. After thorough training in various fields such as martial arts, court etiquette and Islamic sciences, these slaves were freed. However, they were still expected to remain loyal to their master and serve his household. Mamluks had formed a part of the state or military apparatus in Syria and Egypt since at least the 9th century, rising to become governing dynasties of Egypt and the Levant during the Tulunid and Ikhshidid periods. Mamluk regiments constituted the backbone of Egypt's military under Ayyubid rule in the late 12th and early 13th centuries, beginning with Sultan Saladin who replaced the Fatimids' black African infantry with mamluks. Each Ayyubid sultan and high-ranking emir had a private mamluk corps. Most of the mamluks in the Ayyubids' service were ethnic Kipchak Turks from Central Asia, who, upon entering service, were converted to Sunni Islam and taught Arabic. A mamluk was highly committed to his master, to whom he often referred as "father", and was in turn treated more as a kinsman than as a slave. Sultan as-Salih Ayyub, the last of the Ayyubid sultans, had acquired some 1 000 mamluks (some of them free-born) from Syria, Egypt and the Arabian Peninsula by 1229, while serving as na'ib (viceroy) of Egypt during the absence of his father, Sultan al-Kamil. These mamluks were called the "Salihiyyah" (singular "Salihi") after their master.

As-Salih became sultan of Egypt in 1240, and, upon his accession to the Ayyubid throne, he manumitted and promoted large numbers of his original and newly recruited Mamluks on the condition that they remain in his service. To provision his mamluks, as-Salih forcibly seized the iqtaʿat (fiefs; singular iqtaʿ) of his predecessors' emirs. As-Salih sought to create a paramilitary apparatus in Egypt loyal to himself, and his aggressive recruitment and promotion of mamluks led contemporaries to view Egypt as "Salihi-ridden", according to historian Winslow William Clifford. Despite his close relationship with his mamluks, tensions existed between as-Salih and the Salihiyyah, and a number of Salihi mamluks were imprisoned or exiled throughout as-Salih's reign. While historian Stephen Humphreys asserts that the Salihiyyah's increasing dominance of the state did not personally threaten as-Salih due to their fidelity to him, Clifford believes that the Salihiyyah developed an autonomy within the state that fell short of such loyalty. Opposition among the Salihiyyah to as-Salih rose when the latter ordered the assassination of his brother Abu Bakr al-Adil in 1249, a task that affronted many of the Salihiyyah and by whom was rejected; four of the Salihiyyah ultimately agreed to execute the controversial operation.

Rise to power

Conflict with the Ayyubids
Tensions between as-Salih Ayyub and his mamluks came to a head later in 1249 when Louis IX of France's forces captured Damietta in their bid to conquer Egypt during the Seventh Crusade. As-Salih believed Damietta should not have been evacuated and was rumored to have threatened punitive action against the Damietta garrison. The rumor, accentuated by the execution of civilian notables who evacuated Damietta, provoked a mutiny by the garrison of his camp in al-Mansurah, which included numerous Salihi mamluks. The situation was calmed after the intervention of the atabeg al-askar (commander of the military), Fakhr ad-Din ibn Shaykh al-Shuyukh.

As the Crusaders advanced, as-Salih died and was succeeded by his son al-Muazzam Turanshah, who was in al-Jazira (Upper Mesopotamia) at the time. Initially, the Salihiyyah welcomed Turanshah's succession, with many greeting him and requesting confirmation of their administrative posts and iqtaʿ assignments at his arrival to the Egyptian frontier. However, Turanshah sought to challenge the dominance of the Salihiyyah in the paramilitary apparatus by promoting his Kurdish retinue from Upper Mesopotamia ("al-Jazira" in Arabic) and the Levant as a counterweight to the predominantly Turkic Salihiyyah.

Prior to Turanshah's arrival at the front facing the French, the Bahriyyah, a junior regiment of the Salihiyyah commanded by Baibars al-Buduqdari, defeated the Crusaders at the Battle of al-Mansurah on 11 February 1250. On 27 February, Turanshah, as new sultan, arrived in Egypt from Hasankeyf, where he had been Emir of Hisn Kayfa since AH 636 (1238/1239 CE), and went straight to al-Mansurah to lead the Egyptian army. On 5 April 1250, covered by the darkness of night, the Crusaders evacuated their camp opposite al-Mansurah and began to flee northward towards Damietta. The Egyptians followed them into the Battle of Fariskur where the Egyptians utterly destroyed the Crusaders on 6 April. King Louis IX and a few of his surviving nobles surrendered and were taken as prisoners, effectively ending the Seventh Crusade.

Turanshah proceeded to place his own entourage and mamluks, known as the "Mu'azzamiyah", in positions of authority to the detriment of Salihi interests. On 2 May 1250, a group of disgruntled Salihi officers had Turanshah assassinated at his camp in Fariskur.

According to Humphreys, as-Salih's frequent wars against his Ayyubid relatives likely voided the Salihiyyah's loyalty to other members of the Ayyubid dynasty. Nonetheless, the Salihiyyah were careful not to depict the assassination of Turanshah as  an assault against Ayyubid legitimacy, but rather an act against a deviant of the Muslim polity. Moreover, an electoral college dominated by the Salihiyyah convened to choose a successor to Turanshah among the Ayyubid emirs, with opinion largely split between an-Nasir Yusuf of Damascus and al-Mughith Umar of al-Karak. Ultimately, however, consensus settled on as-Salih's widow, Shajar ad-Durr.

Shajar ad-Durr ensured the Salihiyyah's dominance of the paramilitary elite, and ushered in a process of establishing patronage and kinship ties with the Salihiyyah. In particular, she cultivated close ties with the Jamdari (pl. Jamdariyyah) and Bahri (pl. "Bahriyyah") elements of the Salihiyyah, by distributing to them iqtaʿ and other benefits. The Bahriyya were named after the Arabic word bahr, meaning "sea" or "large river", because their barracks was located on the Nile River island of Rawda. They were mostly drawn from among the Cumans-Kipchaks who controlled the steppes north of the Black Sea. Shajar al-Durr's efforts and the lingering desire among the military in Egypt to maintain the Ayyubid state was made evident when the Salihi mamluk and atabeg al-askar, Aybak, attempted to claim the sultanate, but was prevented from monopolizing power by the army and the Bahriyyah and Jamdariyyah, which asserted that only an Ayyubid could exercise sultanic authority. The Bahriyyah compelled Aybak to share power with al-Ashraf Musa, a grandson of Sultan al-Kamil.

Factional power struggles
Aybak was one of the oldest of the Salihi mamluks and a senior member of as-Salih's inner circle, despite only being an emir awsat (middle-ranked emir). He served as the principal bulwark against the more junior Bahri and Jamdari elements of the Salihiyyah, and his promotion to atabeg al-askar was met by Bahri rioting in Cairo, the first of many examples of intra-Salihi tensions surrounding Aybak's ascendancy. The Bahriyyah and Jamdariyyah were represented by their patron, Faris ad-Din Aktay, a principal organizer of Turanshah's assassination and the recipient of Fakhr ad-Din's large estate by Shajar al-Durr; the latter saw Aktay as a counterweight to Aybak. Aybak moved against the Bahriyyah in 1251 by shutting down their Rawda headquarters in a bid to sap Aktay's power base. Aybak was still unable to promote his own mamluks, known as the "Mu'izziyah", to senior posts until 1252. That year, he managed to dispatch Aktay to Upper Egypt to suppress an Arab uprising. Instead of isolating Aktay as was Aybak's intention, the assignment allowed Aktay to impose extortionate taxes in Upper Egypt and provide him the personal funds to finance his patronage of the Bahriyyah. In 1254, Aybak had his Mu'izzi mamluks assassinate Aktay in the Citadel of Cairo.

Afterward, Aybak proceeded to purge those in his retinue and in the Salihiyyah whom he believed were disloyal to him, causing a temporary exodus of Bahri mamluks, most of whom settled in Gaza, but also in Upper Egypt and Syria. The purge led to a dearth of military support for Aybak, which in turn led to Aybak's recruitment of new supporters from among the army in Egypt and the Turkic Nasiri and Azizi mamluks from Syria, who had defected from their Ayyubid masters, namely an-Nasir Yusuf, and moved to Egypt in 1250. The Syrian mamluks were led by their patron Jamal ad-Din Aydughdi and were assigned most of the iqtaʿ of Aktay and his allies. However, Aydughdi's growing ambitions made Aybak view him as a threat. After Aybak learned that Aydughdi was plotting to topple him and recognize an-Nasir Yusuf as Ayyubid sultan, which would likely leave Aydughdi in virtual control of Egypt, Aybak had Aydughdi imprisoned in Alexandria in 1254 or 1255.

Meanwhile, the Bahriyya faction in Gaza commanded by Baybars sought to enlist their services with an-Nasir Yusuf. In an attempt to dislodge Aybak, the Bahriyyah petitioned an-Nasir Yusuf to claim the Ayyubid throne and invade Egypt, but an-Nasir Yusuf initially refused. However, in 1256, he dispatched a Bahri-led expedition to Egypt, but no battle occurred when Aybak met an-Nasir Yusuf's army. Aybak was assassinated on 10 April 1257, possibly on the orders of Shajar al-Durr, who was assassinated a week later. Their deaths left a relative power vacuum in Egypt, with Aybak's teenage son, al-Mansur Ali, as heir to the sultanate. While al-Mansur Ali was sultan, the strongman in Egypt was Aybak's former close aide, Sayf ad-Din Qutuz, who also had hostile relations with the Salihiyyah, including the Bahri mamluks.

By the time of Aybak's death, the Bahriyyah had entered the service of al-Mughith Umar of al-Karak, who agreed to invade Egypt and claim the Ayyubid sultanate, but al-Mughith's small Bahri-dominated invading force was routed at the frontier with Egypt in November. The Bahriyyah and al-Mughith launched a second expedition in 1258, but were again defeated. The Bahriyyah subsequently raided areas around Syria, threatening an-Nasir Yusuf's power in Damascus. After a first attempt to defeat the Bahriyyah near Gaza failed, an-Nasir Yusuf launched a second expedition against them with al-Mansur Muhammad II of Hama, resulting in a Bahriyyah defeat at Jericho. An-Nasir Yusuf proceeded to besiege al-Mughith and the Bahriyyah at al-Karak, but the growing threat of a Mongol invasion of Syria ultimately led to a reconciliation between an-Nasir Yusuf and al-Mughith, and Baybars's defection to the former. Qutuz deposed al-Mansur Ali in 1259. Afterward, he purged and/or arrested the Mu'izziyah and any Bahri mamluks he could locate in Egypt in a bid to eliminate dissent towards his rule. The surviving Mu'izzi and Bahri mamluks made their way to Gaza, where Baybars had created a virtual shadow state in opposition to Qutuz.

While various mamluk factions competed for control of Egypt and Syria, the Mongols under the command of Hulagu Khan had sacked Baghdad, the intellectual and spiritual center of the Islamic world, in 1258, and proceeded westward, capturing Aleppo and Damascus. Qutuz sent military reinforcements to his erstwhile enemy an-Nasir Yusuf in Syria, and reconciled with the Bahriyyah, including Baybars, who was allowed to return to Egypt, to face the common Mongol threat. Hulagu sent emissaries to Qutuz in Cairo, demanding submission to Mongol rule. Qutuz had the emissaries killed, an act which historian Joseph Cummins called the "worst possible insult to the Mongol throne". Qutuz then prepared Cairo's defenses to ward off the Mongols' threatened invasion of Egypt, but after hearing news that Hulagu withdrew from Syria to claim the Mongol throne, Qutuz began preparations for the conquest of Syria. He mobilized a force of some 120,000 soldiers and gained the support of his main Mamluk rival, Baybars.

The Mamluks entered Palestine to confront the Mongol army that Hulagu left behind under the command of Kitbuqa. In September 1260, the two sides met in the plains south of Nazareth in a major confrontation known as the Battle of Ain Jalut. Qutuz had some of his cavalry units hide in the hills around Ain Jalut (Goliath's Spring), while directing Baybars's forces to advance past Ain Jalut against Kitbuqa's Mongols. In the ensuing half-hour clash, Baybars's men feigned a retreat and were pursued by Kitbuqa. The latter's forces fell into a Mamluk trap once they reached the springs of Ain Jalut, with Baybars's men turning around to confront the Mongols and Qutuz's units ambushing the Mongols from the hills. The battle ended in a Mongol rout and Kitbuqa's capture and execution. Afterward, the Mamluks proceeded to recapture Damascus and the other Syrian cities taken by the Mongols. Upon Qutuz's triumphant return to Cairo, he was assassinated in a Bahri plot. Baybars subsequently assumed power in Egypt in late 1260, and established the Bahri Mamluk sultanate.

Bahri rule

Reign of Baybars

Centralisation of power
Baybars rebuilt the Bahriyyah's former headquarters in Rawdah island and put Qalawun, one of his most senior associates, in command of it. In 1263, Baybars deposed al-Mughith of al-Karak based on allegations of collaborating with the Mongol Ilkhanate of Persia, and thus consolidated his authority over Muslim Syria. During his early reign and through heavy financial expense, Baybars rebuilt and stringently trained the Mamluk army, which grew from 10,000 cavalry to 40,000, with a 4,000-strong royal guard at its core. The new force was rigidly disciplined and highly trained in horsemanship, swordsmanship and archery.

Baybars attempted to institute dynastic rule by assigning his four-year-old son al-Said Barakah as co-sultan, thereby ending the Mamluk tradition of electing a leader, but this effort was ultimately unsuccessful, at least for his Zahirid household; successful rulership became highly dependent on Baybars' personal qualities. However, Baybars success in establishing centralized rule resulted in the consolidation of the Mamluk Sultanate.

Communication, postal network
Another major component to Baybar's rule was intrastate communication. To accomplish this, he instituted a postal network that extended across the cities of Egypt and Syria. The need for smooth delivery of correspondence also led to the large scale repair or construction of roads and bridges along the postal route.

Foreign policy
Through opening diplomatic channels with the Mongols, Baybars also sought to stifle a potential alliance between the Mongols and the Christian powers of Europe, while also sowing divisions between the Mongol Ilkhanate and the Mongol Golden Horde. In addition, his diplomacy was also intended to maintain the flow of Turkic mamluks from Mongol-held Central Asia.

Military campaigns
With Bahri power in Egypt and Muslim Syria consolidated by 1265, Baybars launched expeditions against the Crusader fortresses throughout Syria, capturing Arsuf in 1265, and Halba and Arqa in 1266. According to historian Thomas Asbridge, the methods used to capture Arsuf demonstrated the "Mamluks' grasp of siegecraft and their overwhelming numerical and technological supremacy". Baybars' strategy regarding the Crusader fortresses along the Syrian coast was not to capture and utilize the fortresses, but to destroy them and thus prevent their potential future use by new waves of Crusaders.

In August 1266, the Mamluks launched a punitive expedition against the Armenian Cilician Kingdom for its alliance with the Mongols, laying waste to numerous to Armenian villages and significantly weakening the kingdom. At around the same time, Baybars' forces captured Safad from the Knights Templar, and shortly after, Ramla, both cities in interior Palestine. Unlike the coastal Crusader fortresses, the Mamluks strengthened and utilized the interior cities as major garrisons and administrative centers. Campaigns against the Crusaders continued in 1267, and in the spring of 1268, Baybars' forces captured Jaffa before conquering the major Crusader fortress of Antioch on 18 May.

Baybars initiated a more aggressive policy than his predecessors toward the Christian Nubian kingdom of Makuria on Egypt's southern border. In 1265, the Mamluks launched an invasion of northern Makuria, and forced the Nubian king to become a vassal of the Mamluks. Around that time, the Mamluks had conquered the Red Sea areas of Suakin and the Dahlak Archipelago, while attempting to extend their control to the Hejaz, the desert regions west of the Nile, and Barqa (Cyrenaica). In 1268, the Makurian king, David I, overthrew the Mamluks' vassal and in 1272, raided the Mamluk Red Sea port of ‘Aydhab.

Meanwhile, Louis IX of France launched the Eighth Crusade, this time targeting Tunis with the intention of ultimately invading Egypt. However, Louis IX died, allowing the Mamluks to refocus their efforts at further conquests of Crusader territories in Syria, including the County of Tripoli's Krak des Chevaliers fortress, which Baybars captured in 1271. Despite an alliance with the Assassins in 1272, in July 1273, the Mamluks, who by then determined that the Assassins' independence was problematic, wrested control of the Assassins' fortresses in Jabal Ansariyah, including Masyaf. In 1275, the Mamluk governor of Qus, with Bedouin allies, launched an expedition against Makuria, defeating king David in battle at Dongola in 1276, and installed Shakanda as king. This brought the fortress of Qasr Ibrim under Mamluk jurisdiction. The conquest of Nubia was not permanent, however, and the process of invading the region and installing a vassal king would be repeated by Baybars' successors. Nonetheless, Baybars' initial conquest led the annual expectation of tribute from the Nubians by the Mamluks until the Makurian kingdom's demise in the mid-14th century. Furthermore, the Mamluks also received the submission of king Adur of al-Abwab further south. In 1277, Baybars launched an expedition against the Ilkhanids, routing them in Elbistan in Anatolia, before ultimately withdrawing to avoid overstretching their forces and risk being cut off from Syria by a second, large incoming Ilkhanid army.

Early Qalawuni period

In July 1277, Baybars died en route to Damascus, and was succeeded by Barakah. However, the latter's ineptness precipitated a power struggle that ended with Qalawun being elected sultan in November 1279. The Ilkhanids took advantage of the disarray of Baybars' succession by raiding Mamluk Syria, before launching a massive offensive against Syria in the autumn of 1281. Qalawun's forces were significantly outnumbered by the estimated 80,000-strong Ilkhanid-Armenian-Georgian-Seljuk coalition, but marched north from Damascus to meet the Ilkhanid army at Homs. In the 28 October battle of Homs, the Mamluks routed the Ilkhanids and confirmed Mamluk dominance in Syria. The defeat of the Ilkhanids allowed Qalawun to proceed and eliminate the remaining Crusader outposts in Syria. In May 1285, he captured the Marqab fortress and garrisoned it.

Qalawun's early reign was marked by policies that were meant to gain the support of important societal elements, namely the merchant class, the Muslim bureaucracy and the religious establishment. Among these early policies were the elimination of illegal taxes that burdened the merchant community and extensive building and renovation projects for Islam's holiest sites, such as the Prophet's Mosque in Medina, the al-Aqsa Mosque in Jerusalem and the Ibrahimi Mosque in Hebron. Following the détente with the Ilkhanate after 1280, Qalawun launched a wide arrest campaign to eliminate internal dissent, imprisoning dozens of high-ranking emirs in Egypt and Syria. The détente also saw a shift in Qalawun's building activities to focus on more secular and personal purposes, including a large, multi-division hospital complex in Cairo across from the tomb of as-Salih Ayyub. Construction of the hospital, a contrast from his Mamluk predecessors who focused on establishing madrasas, was done to gain the goodwill of the public, create a lasting legacy, and secure his spot in the afterlife. Its location facing as-Salih's tomb was meant demonstrate Qalawun's lasting connection to his master and to honor the Salihiyyah. While the Salihi mamluks were typically Kipchak Turks, Qalawun diversified mamluk ranks purchasing numerous non-Turks, particularly Circassians, forming out of them the Burji regiment.

Qalawun was the last Salihi sultan and following his death in 1290, his son, al-Ashraf Khalil, drew his legitimacy as a Mamluk by emphasizing his lineage from Qalawun, thus inaugurating the Qalawuni period of Bahri rule. Like his two Bahri predecessors, Khalil's main priorities were organization of the sultanate, defeat of the Crusaders and the Mongols, incorporation of Syria into the Mamluk domain and preservation of the import of new mamluks and weaponry. With regards to the latter policy, Baybars had purchased 4,000 mamluks, Qalawun purchased 6,000–7,000 and by the end of Khalil's reign, there was an estimated total of 10,000 mamluks in the sultanate. In 1291, Khalil captured Acre, the last major Crusader fortress in Palestine and thus Mamluk rule extended across the entirety of Syria.

Khalil's death in 1293 led to period of factional struggle, with Khalil's prepubescent brother, an-Nasir Muhammad, being overthrown the following year by a Mongol mamluk of Qalawun, al-Adil Kitbugha, who in turn was succeeded by a Greek mamluk of Qalawun, Husam ad-Din Lajin. In a bid to consolidate his control, Lajin attempted to redistribute iqtaʿat to his supporters. Lajin was unable to retain the sultanate and al-Nasir Muhammad was restored to power in 1298, ruling a fractious realm until being toppled a second time by Baybars II, a Circassian mamluk of Qalawun, who was known to be more wealthy, pious and cultured than his immediate predecessors. Early into an-Nasir Muhammad's second reign, the Ilkhanids, whose leader, Mahmud Ghazan, had converted to Islam, invaded Syria and routed a Mamluk army near Homs in the Battle of Wadi al-Khazandar in 1299. However, Ghazan withdrew most of his troops from Syria shortly after due to a dearth in fodder for their numerous horses and the residual Ilkhanid force retreated in 1300 at the approach of the rebuilt Mamluk army. A further Ilkhanid invasion in 1303 was repelled after the Ilkhanid defeat at the Battle of Marj al-Suffar in the plains south of Damascus.

Third reign of an-Nasir Muhammad

Baybars II ruled for roughly one year before an-Nasir Muhammad became sultan again in 1310, this time ruling for over three consecutive decades in a period that is often considered by historians of the Mamluk period to be the apex of both the Bahri regime specifically and the Mamluk Sultanate in general. To avoid the experiences of his previous two reigns where the mamluks of Qalawun and Khalil held sway and periodically assumed the sultanate, an-Nasir Muhammad launched efforts to establish a centralized autocracy. Early into his third reign, in 1310, an-Nasir Muhammad imprisoned, exiled or killed any Mamluk emirs that supported those who toppled him in the past, including the Burji mamluks. He then assigned emirates to over thirty of his own mamluks. Initially, an-Nasir Muhammad left most of his father's mamluks undisturbed, but in 1311 and 1316, he imprisoned and executed most of them, and again redistributed emirates to his own mamluks. By 1316, the number of mamluks was reduced to 2,000. An-Nasir Muhammad went further in imposing his rule by intervening to have al-Wathiq succeed Caliph al-Mustakfi, as well as compelling the qadi to issue legal rulings that advanced his interests.

The third reign of an-Nasir Muhammad also saw a departure from the traditions of succession and administrative elevation of his predecessors since he observed in his first two reigns that such traditions had been ignored anyway, while sultans were being assassinated and mamluks were abusing other mamluks in bids for power. Moreover, an-Nasir Muhammad's being the son of a mamluk instead of a mamluk himself risked undermining his position among the largely mamluk elite. This partially explains his purges of the thousands of mamluks purchased by his predecessors. Amid conditions that stemmed the flow of mamluks from the Mongol-held lands to the sultanate, an-Nasir Muhammad resolved to make up for the loss of the purged mamluks by adopting new methods of training and military and financial advancement that introduced a great level of permissiveness. This permissiveness, which manifested in far more relaxed conditions for new mamluks, encouraged the pursuit of military careers in Egypt by aspiring mamluks outside of the country, to the point that parents would sell their children as mamluks with the belief the children would enjoy an improved standard of living.

Under an-Nasir Muhammad, the Mamluks successfully repelled an Ilkhanid invasion of Syria in 1313 and then concluded a peace treaty with the Ilkhanate in 1322, bringing a long-lasting end to the Mamluk-Mongol wars. Following the détente, an-Nasir Muhammad was able to usher in a period of stability and prosperity in the sultanate through the enacting of  major political, economic and military reforms that were ultimately intended to ensure his continued rule and consolidate the Qalawunid-Bahri regime. Concurrent with an-Nasir Muhammad's reign was the disintegration of the Ilkhanate into several smaller dynastic states and the consequent Mamluk effort to establish diplomatic and commercial relationships with the new political entities. An-Nasir Muhammad also attempted to assert permanent Mamluk control over the Makurian vassal state, launching an invasion in 1316 and installing a Muslim Nubian king, Abdallah Barshambu. The latter was overthrown by Kanz al-Dawla, who an-Nasir Muhammad temporarily ousted in a 1323/24 expedition.

End of the Bahri regime

An-Nasir Muhammad died in 1341 and his rule was followed by a succession of his descendants to the throne in a period marked by political instability. Most of his successors, except for an-Nasir Hasan (r. 1347–1351, 1354–1361) and al-Ashraf Sha'ban (r. 1363–1367), were sultans in name only, with the patrons of the leading mamluk factions holding actual power. The first of an-Nasir Muhammad's son to accede to the sultanate was Abu Bakr, who an-Nasir Muhammad designated as his successor before his death. However, an-Nasir Muhammad's senior aide, Qawsun, held real power and ultimately imprisoned and executed Abu Bakr and had an-Nasir Muhammad's infant son, al-Ashraf Kujuk, appointed in his stead. By January 1342, however, Qawsun and Kujuk were toppled, and the latter's half-brother, an-Nasir Ahmad of al-Karak, was declared sultan. Ahmad relocated to al-Karak and left a deputy to rule on his behalf in Cairo. This unorthodox move, together with his seclusive and frivolous behavior and his execution of loyal partisans, ended with Ahmad's deposition and replacement by his half-brother as-Salih Ismail in June 1342. Isma'il ruled until his death in August 1345, and was succeeded by his brother al-Kamil Sha'ban. The latter was killed in a mamluk revolt and was succeeded by his brother al-Muzaffar Hajji, who was also killed in a mamluk revolt in late 1347.

Following Hajji's death, the senior emirs of an-Nasir Muhammad hastily appointed another of his sons, the twelve-year-old an-Nasir Hasan. Coinciding with Hasan's first term, in 1347–1348, the Bubonic Plague arrived in Egypt and other plagues followed, causing mass death in the country, which in turn led to major social and economic changes in the region. In 1351, Hasan attempted to assert his executive power and was ousted by the senior emirs, led by Emir Taz, and replaced with his brother, as-Salih Salih. The emirs Shaykhu and Sirghitmish deposed Salih and restored Hasan in a coup in 1355, after which Hasan gradually purged Taz, Shaykhu and Sirghitmish and their mamluks from his administration. Concurrently, Hasan began recruiting and promoting the awlad al-nas (descendants of mamluks who did not experience the enslavement/manumission process) in the military and administration, a process that lasted for the remainder of the Bahri period. This led to resentment from Hasan's own mamluks, led by Emir Yalbugha al-Umari, who killed Hasan in 1361.

Yalbugha became the regent of Hasan's successor and the young son of the late sultan Hajji, al-Mansur Muhammad. By then, mamluk solidarity and loyalty to the emirs had dissipated. To restore discipline and unity within the Mamluk state and military, Yalbugha applied the rigorous educational methods used for mamluks during the reigns of sultans Baybars and Qalawun. In 1365, attempts by the Mamluks to annex Armenia, which had since replaced Crusader Acre as the Christian commercial foothold of Asia, were stifled by an invasion of Alexandria by Peter I of Cyprus. The Mamluks concurrently experienced a deterioration of their lucrative position in international trade and the economy of the sultanate declined, further weakening the Bahri regime. Meanwhile, the perceived harshness of Yalbugha's educational methods and his refusal to rescind his disciplinary reforms led to a mamluk backlash. Yalbugha was subsequently killed by his own mamluks in an uprising in 1366. The rebellious mamluks were supported by Sultan al-Ashraf Sha'ban, who Yalbugha installed in 1363. Sha'ban was able to rule as the real power in the sultanate until 1377, when he was killed by mamluk dissidents on his way to Mecca to perform the Hajj.

Burji rule

Reign of Barquq

Sha'ban was succeeded by his seven-year-old son al-Mansur Ali, although the oligarchy of the senior emirs held the reins of power. Among the senior emirs who rose to prominence under Ali was Barquq, a Circassian mamluk of Yalbugha who was involved in Sha'ban's assassination, and Baraka, another of Yalbugha's mamluks. Barquq was made atabeg al-asakir in 1378, giving him command of the Mamluk army, which he used to oust Baraka in 1380. Afterward, he managed to bring to Egypt his father Anas and many of his kinsmen, possibly in an attempt to establish a power base outside of the Mamluk establishment. Ali died in May 1381 and was succeeded by his nine-year-old brother, as-Salih Hajji. However, power was in the hands of Barquq, as-Salih Hajji's regent; Barquq tried to succeed Ali as sultan, but his bid was vetoed by the other senior emirs. Nonetheless, in the following year, Barquq toppled as-Salih Hajji with the backing of Yalbugha's mamluks and assumed the sultanate, adopting the title of Baybars, "al-Malik az-Zahir".

Barquq's accession had been made possible by the support of Yalbugha's mamluks, whose subsequent rise to power also made Barquq's position vulnerable. His rule was challenged in Syria in 1389 during a revolt by the Mamluk governor of Malatya, Mintash, and the governor of Aleppo, Yalbugha an-Nasiri, who was a former mamluk of both an-Nasir Hasan and Yalbugha al-Umari. The rebels took over Syria and headed for Egypt, prompting Barquq to abdicate in favor of as-Salih Hajji. The alliance between Yalbugha an-Nasiri and Mintash soon fell apart, however, and factional fighting ensued in Cairo ending with Mintash ousting Yalbugha. Barquq was arrested and exiled to al-Karak where he was able to rally support for his return to the throne. In Cairo, Barquq's loyalists took over the citadel and arrested as-Salih Hajji. This paved the way for Barquq's usurpation of the sultanate once more in February 1390, firmly establishing the Burji regime.

Barquq solidified his control over the sultanate in 1393, when his forces killed the major opponent to his rule, Mintash, in Syria. Barquq's reign saw the mass recruitment of Circassians (estimated at 5,000 recruits) into the mamluk ranks and the restoration of the Mamluk state's authority throughout its realm in the tradition of the early Mamluk sultans, Baybars and Qalawun. A major innovation to this system by Barquq was the division of Egypt into three provinces (niyabat) similar to the administrative divisions in Syria. The new Egyptian niyabas were Alexandria, Damanhur and Asyut. Barquq instituted this change as a means to better control the Egyptian countryside from the rising strength of the Arab tribes. To that end, Barquq dispatched the Berber Hawwara tribesmen of the Nile Delta to Upper Egypt to keep the Arab tribes in check.

During Barquq's reign, in 1387, the Mamluks were able to force the Anatolian entity in Sivas to become a Mamluk vassal state. Towards the end of the 14th century, challengers to the Mamluks emerged in Anatolia, including the Ottoman dynasty who absorbed the territory of the Karamanids in central Anatolia and installed a vassal as the leader of the Dulkadirids in 1399, and the Turkic allies of Timur, the Aq Qoyonlu and Kara Qoyounlu tribes who entered southern and eastern Anatolia in the same time period. Barquq entered into a brief engagement with Timur at the Euphrates in 1394, but Timur withdrew during that episode.

Crises and restoration of state power
Barquq died in 1399 and was succeeded by his eleven-year-old son, an-Nasir Faraj, who was in Damascus at the time. In that same year, Timur invaded Syria, sacking Aleppo before proceeding to sack Damascus. The latter had been abandoned by Faraj and his late father's entourage, who left for Cairo. Timur ended his occupation of Syria in 1402 to pursue his war against the Ottomans in Anatolia, who he deemed to be a more dangerous threat to his rule. Faraj was able to hold onto power during this turbulent period, which in addition to Timur's devastating raids, the rise of Turkic tribes in Jazira and attempts by Barquq's emirs to topple Faraj, also saw a famine in Egypt in 1403, a severe plague in 1405 and a Bedouin revolt that virtually ended the Mamluks' hold over Upper Egypt between 1401 and 1413. Thus, Mamluk authority throughout the sultanate was significantly eroded, while the capital Cairo experienced an economic crisis.

Faraj was toppled in 1412 by the Syria-based emirs, Tanam, Jakam, Nawruz and al-Mu'ayyad Shaykh, who Faraj sent a total of seven military expeditions against during his reign. The emirs could not usurp the throne themselves, however, and had Caliph al-Musta'in installed; the caliph had the support of the non-Circassian mamluks and legitimacy with the local population. Six months later, Shakyh eased al-Musta'in out of power after neutralizing his main rival, Nawruz, and assumed the sultanate. Shaykh's main goal in office was restoration of the state's authority within the sultanate, which saw further plagues in 1415–1417 and 1420. During his reign, Shaykh reestablished the state's fiscal administration to replenish the treasury. To that end, his fiscal administrator led tax collection expeditions that were akin to plundering throughout the sultanate to compensate for the tax arrears that had accumulated under Faraj's reign. Shaykh also commissioned and led military expeditions against the Mamluks' enemies in Anatolia, reasserting the state's influence in that region.

Reign of Barsbay
Before Shaykh died in 1421, he sought to offset the power of the Circassian mamluks by importing Turkish mamluks and installing a Turk as atabeg al-asakir in 1420 to serve as regent for his infant son Ahmad. However, following his death, a Circassian emir, Tatar, married Shaykh's widow, ousted the atabeg al-asakir and assumed power. Tatar died three months into his reign and was succeeded by Barsbay, another Circassian emir of Barquq, in 1422.

Barsbay pursued an economic policy of establishing state monopolies over the lucrative trade with Europe, particularly regarding spices, to the chagrin of the civilian merchants of the sultanate. Moreover, Barsbay compelled Red Sea traders to offload their goods at the Mamluk-held Hejazi port of Jeddah rather than the Yemeni port of Aden in order to derive the most financial benefit from the Red Sea transit route to Europe. Barsbay also undertook efforts to better protect the caravan routes to the Hejaz from Bedouin raids and the Egyptian Mediterranean coast from Catalan and Genoese piracy. With regards to European pirates, he launched campaigns against Cyprus in 1425–1426, during which the island's king was taken captive, because of his alleged assistance to the pirates; the large ransoms paid to the Mamluks by the Cypriots allowed them to mint new gold coinage for the first time since the 14th century. Barsbay's efforts at monopolization and trade protection were meant to offset the severe financial losses of the sultanate's agricultural sector due to the frequent recurring plagues that took a heavy toll on the farmers.

Barsbay launched military expeditions against the Aq Qoyonlu in 1429 and 1433. The first expedition involved the sacking of Edessa and the massacre of its Muslim inhabitants in retaliation for the Aq Qoyonlu's raids against the Mamluks' Mesopotamian territories. The second expedition was against the Aq Qoyonlu capital of Amid, which ended with the Aq Qoyonlu recognizing Mamluk suzerainty. While the Mamluks were able to force the Anatolian beyliks to generally submit to their hegemony in the region, Mamluk authority in Upper Egypt was largely relegated to the emirs of the Hawwara tribe. The latter had grown wealthy from their burgeoning trade with central Africa and achieved a degree of local popularity due to their piety, education and generally benign treatment of the inhabitants.

Fall

While the Ottoman sultan Bayezid II was engaged in Europe, a new round of conflict broke out between Egypt and the Safavid dynasty in Persia in 1501. Shah Ismail I sent an embassy to Venice and Syria inviting them to join arms and recover the territory taken from them by the Ottoman Empire. The Mamluk sultan Qansuh al-Ghawri was warned by the Ottoman sultan Selim I that al-Ghawri was providing the envoys of the Ismail I safe passage through Syria on their way to Venice and harboring refugees. To appease him, al-Ghawri placed in confinement the Venetian merchants then in Syria and Egypt, but after a year released them.

After the Battle of Chaldiran in 1514, Selim I attacked the Dulkadirids, an Egyptian vassal, and sent their chief's head to al-Ghawri. Secure now against Ismail I, in 1516 he drew together a great army aiming at conquering Egypt, but to obscure the fact he presented the mobilisation of his army as being part of the war against Ismail I. The war started in 1516 which led to the later incorporation of Egypt and its dependencies in the Ottoman Empire, with Mamluk cavalry proving no match for the Ottoman artillery and the janissaries. On 24 August 1516, at the Battle of Marj Dabiq, al-Ghawri was killed. Syria passed into Ottoman possession, and the Ottomans were welcomed in many places as deliverance from the Mamluks.

The Mamluk Sultanate survived until 1517, when it was conquered by the Ottoman Empire. Ottoman sultan Selim I captured Cairo on January 20, the center of power transferred then to Constantinople. On January 25, the Mamluk Sultanate collapsed. Although not in the same form as under the Sultanate, the Ottoman Empire retained the Mamluks as an Egyptian ruling class and the Mamluks and the Burji family succeeded in regaining much of their influence, but remained vassals of the Ottomans.

Circassian Mamluks like the Gharbiyya Khashif Inal al-Sayfi Tarabay started slaughtering Arab Bedouin shaykhs like Shukr and his brother Hasan ibn Mar'i in 1519 in revenge for the Bedouin betraying the Circassian Mamluks to the Ottomans. They executed another brother of the two in Cairo and at Nasr Gate they hoisted the heads of the 2 brothers. The Qalyub kashif killed another Arab Bedouin Shaykh, 'Ali al-Asmar ibn Abi'l-Shawarib. Husam al-Din ibn Baghdad accused the Mamluks of the murders due to their Ottoman sympathies at a council of Arab shaykhs.

Although the Mamluk Sultanate was ended by the Ottoman conquest, the Mamluks as a "self-perpetuating, largely Turkish-speaking warrior class" continued to influence politics under Ottoman rule. Between 1688 and 1755, Mamluk beys, allied with Bedouin and factions within the Ottoman garrison, deposed no fewer than thirty-four governors. The Mamluk influence remained a force in Egyptian politics until their abrupt end at the hands of Muhammad Ali in 1811. One Mamluk, Al-Alfi was reported by al-Jabarti to marry Bedouin women many times, sending those back he did not like and keeping those that pleased him. Many Bedouin women mourned his death. Muhammad Ali took advantage of Al-Alfi's death to try to assert authority over the Bedouins. Two Ottoman era Mamluks, Iwaz Bey's Mamluk Yusuf Bey al-Jazzar and Jazzar Pasha were known for massacring Bedouins and given the name "butcher" (al-Jazzar) for it. After Muhammad Ali defeated the Mamluks and Bedouin, the Bedouin went on a destructive rampage against the Egyptian fellahin peasantry, destroying and looting crops and massacred 200 townsmen in  Belbeis in Al-Sharqiya province and also rampaging through al-Qaliubiyya province.

Society

Language
By the time the Mamluks took power, Arabic had already been established as the language of religion, culture and the bureaucracy in Egypt, and was widespread among non-Muslim communities there as well. Arabic's wide use among Muslim and non-Muslim commoners had likely been motivated by their aspiration to learn the language of the ruling and scholarly elite. Another contributing factor was the wave of Arab tribal migration to Egypt and subsequent intermarriage between Arabs and the indigenous population. The Mamluks contributed to the expansion of Arabic in Egypt through their victory over the Mongols and the Crusaders and the subsequent creation of a Muslim haven in Egypt and Syria for Arabic-speaking immigrants from other conquered Muslim lands. The continuing invasions of Syria by Mongol armies led to further waves of Syrian immigrants, including scholars and artisans, to Egypt.

Although Arabic was used as the administrative language of the sultanate, a variety of Kipchak Turkic, namely the Mamluk-Kipchak language was the spoken language of the Mamluk ruling elite. According to Petry, "the Mamluks regarded Turkish as their caste's vehicle of communication, even though they themselves spoke Central Asian dialects such as Qipjak, or Circassian, a Caucasic language." According to historian Michael Winter, "Turkishness" was the distinctive aspect of the Mamluk ruling elite, for only they knew how to speak Turkish and had Turkish names. While the Mamluk elite was ethnically diverse, those who were not Turkic in origin were Turkicized nonetheless. As such, the ethnically Circassian mamluks who gained prominence with the rise of the Burji regime and became the dominant ethnic element of the government, were educated in the Turkish language and were considered to be Turks by the Arabic-speaking population.

The ruling military elite of the sultanate was exclusive to those of mamluk background, with rare exceptions. Ethnicity served as a major factor separating the mostly Turkic or Turkicized Mamluk elite from their Arabic-speaking subjects. Ethnic origin was a key component of an individual mamluk's identity, and ethnic identity manifested itself through given names, dress, access to administrative positions and was indicated by a sultan's nisba. The sons of mamluks, known as the awlad al-nas, did not typically hold positions in the military elite and instead, were often part of the civilian administration or the Muslim religious establishment. Among the Bahri sultans and emirs, there existed a degree of pride of their Kipchak Turkish roots, and their non-Kipchak usurpers such as sultans Kitbuqa, Baybars II and Lajin were often de-legitimized in the Bahri-era sources for their non-Kipchak origins. The Mamluk elites of the Burji period were also apparently proud of their Circassian origins.

Religion

Muslim community

A wide range of Islamic religious expression existed in Egypt during the early Mamluk era, namely Sunni Islam and its major madhabs (schools of thought) and various Sufi orders, but also small communities of Ismai'li Shia Muslims, particularly in Upper Egypt. In addition, there was a significant minority of Coptic Christians. Under Sultan Saladin, the Ayyubids embarked on a program of reviving and strengthening Sunni Islam in Egypt to counter Christianity, which had been reviving under the religiously benign rule of the Fatimids, and Ismailism, the branch of Islam of the Fatimid state. Under the Bahri sultans, the promotion of Sunni Islam was pursued more vigorously than under the Ayyubids. The Mamluks were motivated in this regard by personal piety or political expediency for Islam was both an assimilating and unifying factor between the Mamluks and the majority of their subjects; the early mamluks had been brought up as Sunni Muslims and the Islamic faith was the only aspect of life shared between the Mamluk ruling elite and its subjects. While the precedent set by the Ayyubids highly influenced the Mamluk state's embrace of Sunni Islam, the circumstances in the Muslim Middle East in the aftermath of the Crusader and Mongol invasions also left Mamluk Egypt as the last major Islamic power able to confront the Crusaders and the Mongols. Thus, the early Mamluk embrace of Sunni Islam also stemmed from the pursuit of a moral unity within their realm based on the majority views of its subjects.

The Mamluks sought to cultivate and utilize Muslim leaders to channel the religious feelings of the sultanate's Muslim subjects in a manner that did not disrupt the sultanate's authority. Similar to their Ayyubid predecessors, the Bahri sultans showed particular favoritism towards the Shafi'i madhab, while also promoting the other major Sunni madhabs, namely the Maliki, Hanbali and Hanafi. Baybars ended the Ayyubid and early Mamluk tradition of selecting a Shafi'i scholar as qadi al-qudah (chief judge) and instead had a qadi al-qudah appointed from each of the four madhabs. This policy change may have been partly motivated by a desire to accommodate an increasingly diverse Muslim population whose components had immigrated to Egypt from regions where other madhabs were prevalent. Ultimately, however, the diffusion of the post of qadi al-qudah among the four madhabs enabled Mamluk sultans to act as patrons for each madhab and thus gain more influence over them. Regardless of the policy change, the Shafi'i scholars maintained a number of privileges over their colleagues from the other madhabs.

The Mamluks also embraced the various Sufi orders that existed in the sultanate. Sufism was widespread in Egypt by the 13th century, and the Shadhiliyyah was the most popular Sufi order. The Shadhiliyyah lacked an institutional structure and was flexible in its religious thought, allowing it to easily adapt to its local environment. It incorporated Sunni Islamic piety with its basis in the Qur'an and hadith, Sufi mysticism, and elements of popular religion such as sainthood, ziyarat (visitation) to the tombs of saintly or religious individuals, and dhikr (invocation of God). Other Sufi orders with large numbers of adherents were the Rifa'iyyah and Badawiyyah. While the Mamluks patronized the Sunni ulama through appointments to government office, they patronized the Sufis by funding zawiyas (Sufi lodges). On the other end of the spectrum of Sunni religious expression were the teachings of the Hanbali scholar Ibn Taymiyyah, which emphasized stringent moral rigor based on literal interpretations of the Qur'an and the Sunnah, and a deep hostility to the aspects of mysticism and popular religious innovations promoted by the various Sufi orders. While Ibn Taymiyyah was not a typical representative of Sunni orthodoxy in the sultanate, he was the most prominent Muslim scholar of the Mamluk era and was arrested numerous times by the Mamluk government for his religious teachings, which are still influential in the modern-day Muslim world. Ibn Taymiyyah's doctrines were regarded
as being heretical by the Sunni establishment patronized by the Mamluks.

Christian and Jewish communities

Christians and Jews in the sultanate were governed by the dual authority of their respective religious institutions and the sultan. The authority of the former extended to many of the everyday aspects of Christian and Jewish life and was not restricted to the religious practices of the two respective communities. The Mamluk government, often under the official banner of the Pact of Umar which gave Christians and Jews dhimmi (protected peoples) status, ultimately determined the taxes that Christians and Jews paid to the sultanate, including the jizyah (tax on non-Muslims), whether a house of worship could be constructed and the public appearance of Christians and Jews. Jews generally fared better than Christians, and the latter experienced more difficulty under Mamluk rule than under previous Muslim powers. The association of Christians with the Mongols, due to the latter's use of Armenian and Georgian Christian auxiliaries, the attempted alliance between the Mongols and the Crusader powers, and the massacre of Muslim communities and the sparing of Christians in cities captured by the Mongols, may have contributed to rising anti-Christian sentiments in the Mamluk era. The manifestations of anti-Christian hostility were mostly spearheaded at the popular level rather than under the direction of Mamluk sultans. The main source of popular hostility was resentment at the privileged positions many Christians held in the Mamluk bureaucracy.

The Coptic decline in Egypt occurred under the Bahri sultans and accelerated further under the Burji regime. There were several instances of Egyptian Muslim protests against the wealth of Coptic Christians and their employment with the state, and both Muslim and Christian rioters burned down each other's houses of worship in times of intercommunal tensions. As a result of popular pressure, Coptic Christians had their employment in the bureaucracy terminated at least nine times between the late 13th and mid-15th centuries, and on one occasion, in 1301, the government ordered the closure of all churches. Coptic bureaucrats would often be restored to their positions after the moment of tension passed. Many Coptic Christians decided to convert to Islam or at least adopt the outward expressions of Muslim faith to protect their employment, avoid jizyah taxation and avoid official measures against them. The 14th century saw a large wave of Coptic conversions to Islam as a result of the intermittent persecution and destruction of the churches and forced conversion to Islam. Others may have converted in order to retain employment. By the end of the Mamluk period, the ratio of Muslims to Christians in Egypt may have risen to 10:1.

In Syria, the Mamluks uprooted the local Maronite and Greek Orthodox Christians from the coastal areas as a means to prevent their potential contact with European powers. The Maronite Church was especially suspected by the Mamluks of collaboration with the Europeans due to the high degree of relations between the Maronite Church and the papacy in Rome and the Christian European powers, particularly Cyprus. The Greek Orthodox Church experienced a decline following the Mamluk destruction of its spiritual center, Antioch, and the Timurid destruction of Aleppo and Damascus in 1400. The Syriac Christians also experienced a significant decline in Syria due to intra-communal disputes over patriarchal succession and the destruction of churches by the Timurids or local Kurdish tribes. The Mamluks brought about a similar decline of the Armenian Orthodox Church after their capture of the Armenian Cilician Kingdom in 1374, in addition to the raids of the Timurids in 1386 and the conflict between the Timurids and the nomadic Turkmen Aq Qoyunlu and Kara Qoyonlu tribal confederations in Cilicia.

Bedouin relationship with the state
Bedouin tribes served as a reserve force in the Mamluk military. Under the third reign of an-Nasir Muhammad in particular, the Bedouin tribes, particularly those of Syria, such as the Al Fadl, were strengthened and integrated into the economy as well. Bedouin tribes were also a major source of the Mamluk cavalry's Arabian horses. Qalawun purchased horses from the Bedouin of Barqa, which were inexpensive but of high quality, while an-Nasir Muhammad spent extravagant sums for horses from numerous Bedouin sources, including Barqa, Syria, Iraq and Bahrayn (eastern Arabia).

Sultans Baybars and Qalawun, and the Syrian viceroys of an-Nasir Muhammad during his first two reigns, emirs Salar and Baybars II, were averse to granting Bedouin sheikhs iqtaʿat, and when they did, the iqtaʿat were of low quality. However, during an-Nasir Muhammad's third reign, the Al Fadl were granted high-quality iqtaʿat in abundance, strengthening the tribe to become the most powerful among the Bedouin of the Syrian Desert region. Beyond his personal admiration of the Bedouin, an-Nasir Muhammad's motivation for distributing iqtaʿat to Al Fadl, especially under the leadership of Muhanna ibn Isa, was to prevent them from defecting to the Ilkhanate, which their leaders had done frequently in the first half of the 14th century. Competition over iqtaʿat and the post of amir al-ʿarab (chief commander of the Bedouin) among the Bedouin tribes of Syria, particularly the Al Fadl, led to conflict and rebellion among the tribes, leading to mass bloodshed in Syria in the aftermath of an-Nasir Muhammad's death. The Mamluk leadership in Syria, weakened by the losses of the Black Plague, was unable to quell the Bedouin through military expeditions, so they resolved to assassinate the sheikhs of the tribes. The Al Fadl tribe eventually lost favor, while the Bedouin tribes of al-Karak were strengthened by the later Bahri sultans.

In Egypt, the Mamluks, particularly during an-Nasir Muhammad's third reign, had a similar relationship with the Bedouin as in Syria. The 'Isa Ibn Hasan al-Hajjan tribe became powerful in the country after being assigned massive iqtaʿat. The tribe remained strong after an-Nasir Muhammad's death, but frequently rebelled against the succeeding Bahri sultans, but were restored each time, before its sheikh was finally executed as a rebel in 1353. In Sharqiya in Lower Egypt, the Tha'laba tribes were charged with overseeing the postal routes, but they were often unreliable in this regard and ultimately joined the Al A'id tribes during their raids. Bedouin tribal wars frequently disrupted trade and travel in Upper Egypt, and caused the destruction of cultivated lands and sugar processing plants. In the mid-14th century, Bedouin tribes in Upper Egypt, namely the rival Arak and Banu Hilal, became the de facto rulers of the region, forcing the Mamluks to rely on them for tax collection. The Bedouin were ultimately purged from Upper and Lower Egypt by the campaigns of Emir Shaykhu in 1353.

Government
The Mamluks did not significantly alter the administrative, legal and economic systems that they inherited from the Ayyubid state. The Mamluk territorial domain was virtually the same as that of the Ayyubid state i.e. Egypt, the Levant and the Hejaz (western Arabia). However, unlike the collective sovereignty of the Ayyubids where territory was divided among members of the royal family, the Mamluk state was unitary. Under certain Ayyubid sultans, Egypt had paramountcy over the Syrian provinces, but under the Mamluks this paramountcy was consistent and absolute. Cairo remained the capital of the sultanate and its social, economic and administrative center, with the Cairo Citadel serving as the sultan's headquarters.

Authority of the sultan

The Mamluk sultan was the ultimate government authority, while he delegated power to provincial governors known as nuwwab as-saltana (deputy sultans, sing. na'ib as-saltana). Generally, the vice-regent of Egypt was the most senior na'ib, followed by the governor of Damascus, then Aleppo, then the governors of al-Karak, Safad, Tripoli, Homs and Hama. In Hama, the Mamluks had permitted the Ayyubids to continue to govern until 1341 (its popular governor in 1320, Abu'l Fida, was granted the honorary title of sultan by an-Nasir Muhammad), but otherwise the nuwwab of the provinces were Mamluk emirs.

A consistent accession process occurred with every new Mamluk sultan. It more or less involved the election of a sultan by a council of emirs and mamluks (who would give him an oath of loyalty), the sultan's assumption of the monarchical title al-malik, a state-organized procession through Cairo at the head of which was the sultan, and the reading of the sultan's name in the khutbah (Friday prayer sermon). The process was not formalized and the electoral body was never defined, but typically consisted of the emirs and mamluks of whatever Mamluk faction held sway; usurpations of the throne by rival factions were relatively common. Despite the electoral nature of accession, dynastic succession was nonetheless a reality at times, particularly during the Bahri regime, where Baybars' sons Barakah and Solamish succeeded him, before Qalawun usurped the throne and was thereafter succeeded by four generations of direct descendants, with occasional interruptions. Hereditary rule was much less frequent during the Burji regime. Nonetheless, with rare exception, the Burji sultans were all linked to the regime's founder Barquq through blood or mamluk affiliation. The accession of blood relatives to the sultanate was often the result of the decision or indecision of senior Mamluk emirs or the will of the preceding sultan. The latter situation applied to the sultans Baybars, Qalawun, the latter's son, an-Nasir Muhammad and Barquq, who formally arranged for one or more of their sons to succeed them. More often than not, the sons of sultans were elected by the senior emirs with the ultimate intention that they serve as convenient figureheads presiding over an oligarchy of the emirs.

Lesser-ranked Mamluk emirs viewed the sultan more as a peer whom they entrusted with ultimate authority and as a benefactor whom they expected would guarantee their salaries and monopoly on the military. When emirs felt the sultan was not ensuring their benefits, disruptive riots, coup plots or delays to calls for service were all likely scenarios. Often, the practical restrictions on a sultan's power came from his own khushdashiyyah, defined by historian Amalia Levanoni as "the fostering of a common bond between mamluks who belonged to the household of a single master and their loyalty towards him." The foundation of Mamluk organization and factional unity was based on the principles of khushdashiyya, which was a crucial component of a sultan's authority and power. Besides his khushdashiyyah, the sultan derived power from other emirs, with whom there was constant tension, particularly in times of peace with external enemies. According to Holt, the factious nature of emirs who were not the sultan's khushdashiyyah derived from the primary loyalty of emirs and mamluks to their own ustadh (master) before the sultan. However, emirs who were part of the sultan's khushdashiyyah also rebelled at times, particularly the governors of Syria who formed power bases within their territory. Typically, the faction most loyal to the sultan were the Royal Mamluks, particularly those mamluks whom the sultan had personally recruited and manumitted. This was in contrast to the qaranis, who were those in the Royal Mamluks' ranks who had been recruited by a sultan's predecessors and thus lacked khushdashiyyah bonds with the sultan. The qaranis occasionally constituted a hostile faction to a sultan, such as in the case of Sultan as-Salih Ayyub and the Qalawuni successors of an-Nasir Muhammad.

The sultan was the head of state and among his powers and responsibilities were issuing and enforcing specific legal orders and general rules, making the decision to go to war, levying taxes for military campaigns, ensuring the proportionate distribution of food supplies throughout the sultanate and, in some cases, overseeing the investigation and punishment of alleged criminals. A Mamluk sultan or his appointees led the annual Hajj pilgrimage caravans from Cairo and Damascus in the capacity of amir al-hajj (commander of the Hajj caravan). Starting with Qalawun, the Mamluks also monopolized the tradition of providing the annual decorated covering of the Kaaba, in addition to patronizing Jerusalem's Dome of the Rock. Another prerogative, at least of the early Bahri sultans, was to import as many mamluks as possible into the sultanate, preferring those who originated from the territories of the Mongols. However, the Mamluks' enemies, such as the Mongol powers and their Muslim vassals, the Armenians and the Crusaders, successfully disrupted the flow of mamluks into the sultanate. Unable to meet the military's need for new mamluks, the sultans often resorted to turning Ilkhanid deserters or prisoners of war into soldiers, sometimes while the war the prisoners were captured in was still ongoing.

Role of the caliph
To legitimize their rule, the Mamluks presented themselves as the defenders of Islam, and, beginning with Baybars, sought the confirmation of their executive authority from a caliph. The Ayyubids had owed their allegiance to the Abbasid Caliphate, but the latter was destroyed when the Mongols sacked the Abbasid capital Baghdad in 1258 and killed Caliph al-Musta'sim. Three years later, Baybars reestablished the institution of the caliphate by making a member of the Abbasid family, al-Mustansir, caliph, who in turn confirmed Baybars as sultan. In addition, the caliph recognized the sultan's authority over Egypt, Syria, Mesopotamia, Diyarbakir, the Hejaz and Yemen and any territory conquered from the Crusaders or Mongols. Al-Mustansir's Abbasid successors continued in their official capacity as caliphs, but virtually held no power in the Mamluk government. The less than year-long reign of Caliph al-Musta'in as sultan in 1412 was an anomaly.  In an anecdotal testament to the caliph's lack of real authority, a group of rebellious mamluks responded to Sultan Lajin's presentation of the Caliph al-Hakim's decree asserting Lajin's authority with the following comment, recorded by Ibn Taghribirdi: "Stupid fellow. For God's sake—who pays any heed to the caliph now?"

Military and administrative hierarchy

The Mamluk sultans were products of the military hierarchy, entry into which was virtually restricted to mamluks, i.e. those soldiers who were imported while young slaves. However, the sons of mamluks could enter and rise high within the ranks of the military hierarchy, but typically did not enter military service. Instead, many entered into mercantile, scholastic or other civilian careers. The army Baybars inherited consisted of Kurdish and Turkic tribesmen, refugees from the various Ayyubid armies of Syria and other troops from armies dispersed by the Mongols. Following the Battle of Ain Jalut, Baybars restructured the army into three components: the Royal Mamluk regiment, the soldiers of the emirs, and the halqa (non-mamluk soldiers). The Royal Mamluks, who were under the direct command of the sultan, were the highest-ranking body within the army, entry into which was exclusive. The Royal Mamluks were virtually the private corps of the sultan. The lower-ranking emirs also had their own corps, which were akin to private armies. The soldiers of the emirs were directly commanded by the emirs, but could be mobilized by the sultan when needed. As emirs were promoted, the number of soldiers in their corps increased, and when rival emirs challenged each other's authority, they would often utilize their respective forces, leading to major disruptions of civilian life. The halqa had inferior status to the mamluk regiments. It had its own administrative structure and was under the direct command of the sultan. The halqa regiments declined in the 14th century when professional non-mamluk soldiers generally stopped joining the force.

The Ayyubid army had lacked a clear and permanent hierarchical system and one of Baybars' early reforms was creating a military hierarchy. To that end, he began the system of assigning emirs ranks of ten, forty and one hundred, with the particular number indicating how many mounted mamluk troops were assigned to an emir's command. In addition, an emir of one hundred could be assigned one thousand mounted troops during battle. Baybars instituted uniformity within the army and put an end to the previous improvised nature of the various Ayyubid military forces of Egypt and Syria. To bring further uniformity to the military, Baybars and Qalawun standardized the undefined Ayyubid policies regarding the distribution of iqtaʿat to emirs. The reformation of iqtaʿ distribution created a clear link between an emir's rank and the size of his iqtaʿ. For example, an emir of forty would be given an iqtaʿ a third of the size of an emir of one hundred's iqtaʿ. Baybars also began biweekly inspections of the troops to verify that sultanic orders were carried out, in addition to the periodic inspections in which he would distribute new weaponry to the mamluk troops. Starting with the reign of Qalawun, the sultan and the military administration maintained lists of all emirs throughout the sultanate and defined their roles as part of the right or left flanks of the army should they be mobilized for war.

Gradually, as mamluks increasingly filled administrative and courtier posts within the state, Mamluk innovations to the Ayyubid hierarchy were developed. The offices of ustadar (majordomo), hajib (chamberlain), emir jandar and khazindar (treasurer), which existed during the Ayyubid period, were preserved, but Baybars established the additional offices of dawadar, emir akhur, ru'us al-nawab and emir majlis. The administrative offices were largely ceremonial posts and were closely connected to various elements of the military hierarchy.

The ustadar (from the Arabic ustadh al-dar, "master of the house") was the chief of staff of the sultan, responsible for organizing the royal court's daily activities, managing the personal budget of the sultan and supervising all of the buildings of the Cairo Citadel and its staff. The ustadar was often referred to as the ustadar al-aliyah (grand master of the house) to distinguish from ustadar saghirs (lesser majordomos) whose authority was subordinate to the ustadar al-aliyah and who oversaw specific aspects of the court and citadel, such as the sultan's treasury, private property and the kitchens of the citadel. Mamluk emirs also had their own ustadars. The office of ustadar al-aliyah became a powerful post beginning in the late 14th century, particularly so under sultans Barquq and an-Nasir Faraj, who transferred the responsibilities of the special bureau for their mamluks to the authority of the ustadar, thus turning the latter into the sultanate's chief financial official.

Economy

The Mamluk economy essentially consisted of two spheres: the state economy, which was organized along the lines of an elite household and was controlled by a virtual caste government headed by the sultan, and the free market economy, which was the domain of society in general and which was associated with the native inhabitants in contrast to the ethnically foreign origins of the Mamluk ruling elite. The Mamluks introduced greater centralization over the economy by organizing the state bureaucracy, particularly in Cairo (Damascus and Aleppo already had organized bureaucracies), and the Mamluk military hierarchy and its associated iqtaʿ system. In Egypt in particular, the Nile River's centralizing influence also contributed to Mamluk centralization over the region. The Mamluks used the same currency system as the Ayyubids, which consisted of gold dinars, silver dirhams and copper fulus. In general, the monetary system during the Mamluk period was highly unstable due to frequent monetary changes enacted by various sultans. Increased circulation of copper coins and the increased use of copper in dirhams often led to inflation.

The Mamluks created an administrative body called the hisbah to supervise the market, with a muhtasib (inspector-general) in charge of the body. There were four muhtasibs based in Cairo, Alexandria, al-Fustat and Lower Egypt. The muhtasib in Cairo was the most senior of the four and his position was akin to that of a finance minister. The role of a muhtasib was to inspect weights and measures and the quality of goods, maintain legal trade, and to remain vigilant of price gouging. Typically, a qadi or Muslim scholar would occupy the post, but in the 15th century, Mamluk emirs began to be appointed as muhtasibs in an effort to compensate emirs during cash shortages or as a result of the gradual shift of the muhtasib's role from the legal realm to one of enforcement.

Iqtaʿ system
The iqtaʿ system was inherited from the Ayyubids and further organized under the Mamluks to fit their military needs. Iqtaʿat were a central component of the Mamluk power structure. The iqtaʿ of the Muslims differed from the European concept of fiefs in that iqtaʿ represented a right to collect revenue from a fixed territory and was accorded to an officer (emir) as income and as a financial source to provision his soldiers. However, prior to the Mamluks' rise, there was a growing tendency of iqtaʿ holders to treat their iqtaʿ as personal property, which they passed down to their descendants. The Mamluks effectively put an end to this tendency, with the exception of some areas, namely in Mount Lebanon, where longtime Druze iqtaʿ holders, who became part of the halqa, were able to resist the abolition of their hereditary iqtaʿat. In the Mamluk era, the iqtaʿ was an emir's principal source of income, and starting in 1337, Mamluk iqtaʿ holders would lease or sell rights to their iqtaʿat to non-mamluks in order to derive greater revenues. By 1343, the practice was common and by 1347, the sale of iqta'at became taxed. The revenues emanating from the iqtaʿ also served as a more stable source of income than other methods the Mamluks sometimes employed, including tax hikes, the sale of administrative posts and extortion of the population. According to historian J. van Steenbergen, The iqtaʿ system was fundamental in assuring a legitimized, controlled and guaranteed access to the resources of the Syro-Egyptian realm to an upper level of Mamluk society that was primarily military in form and organization. As such it was a fundamental feature of Mamluk society, on the one hand giving way to a military hierarchy that crystallized into an even more developed economic hierarchy and that had substantial economic interests in society at large; on the other hand, it deeply characterized the realm's economic and social development, its agriculture, grain trade, and rural demography in particular.

The system largely consisted of land assignments from the state in return for military services. Land was assessed by the periodic rawk (cadastral survey), which consisted of a survey of land parcels (measured by feddan units), assessment of land quality and the annual estimated tax revenue of the parcels, and classification of a parcel's legal status as waqf (trust) or iqtaʿ. The rawk surveys organized the iqtaʿ system and the first rawk was carried out in 1298 under Sultan Lajin. A second and final rawk was completed in 1315 under Sultan an-Nasir Muhammad and influenced political and economic developments of the Mamluk Sultanate until its fall in the early 16th century.

Over time, the iqtaʿ system was expanded, and increasingly larger areas of kharaj (taxable lands) were appropriated as iqtaʿ lands in order to meet the fiscal needs of the Mamluk military institution, namely payment of Mamluk officers and their subordinates. The Mamluk state resolved to increase allotments by dispersing an individual emir's iqtaʿat over several provinces and for brief terms. However, this led to a situation where the iqtaʿ holders neglected the administrative oversight, maintenance and infrastructure of their iqtaʿat, while concentrating solely on collecting revenues, thereby resulting in less productivity of the iqtaʿat.

Agriculture
Agriculture was the primary source of revenue in the Mamluk economy. Agricultural products were the main exports of Mamluk Egypt, Syria and Palestine. Moreover, the major industries of sugar and textile production were also dependent on agricultural products, namely sugar cane and cotton, respectively. Every agricultural commodity was taxed by the state, with the sultan's treasury taking the largest share of the revenues; emirs and major private brokers followed. An emir's main source of income were the agricultural products of his iqtaʿ, and with those revenues, he was able to fund his private corps.

In Egypt, Mamluk centralization over agricultural production was more thorough than in Syria and Palestine for a number of reasons. Among them was that virtually all agriculture in Egypt depended on a single source of irrigation, the Nile, and the measures and rights to irrigation were determined by the river's flooding, whereas in Syria and Palestine, there were multiple sources of mostly rain-fed irrigation, and measures and rights were thus determined at the local level. Centralization over Syria and Palestine was also more complicated than in Egypt due to the diversity of those regions' geography and the frequent invasions of the Syro-Palestinian territories. The state's role in Syro-Palestinian agriculture was restricted to the fiscal administration and to the irrigation networks and other aspects of rural infrastructure. Although the level of centralization was not as high as in Egypt, the Mamluks did impose enough control over the Syrian economy to derive revenues from Syria that benefited the sultanate and contributed to the defense of its realm. Furthermore, the maintenance of the Mamluk army in Syria relied on the state's control over Syrian agricultural revenues.

Among the responsibilities of a Mamluk provincial or district governor were repopulating depopulated areas to foster agricultural production, protecting the lands from Bedouin raids, increasing productivity in barren lands (likely through the upkeep and expansion of existing irrigation networks), and devoting special attention to the cultivation of the more arable low-lying regions. In order to ensure that rural life was undisturbed by Bedouin raiding, which could halt agricultural work or damage crops and agrarian infrastructure and thus decrease revenues, the Mamluks attempted to prevent Bedouin armament and confiscate existing weapons from them.

Trade and industry
Egypt and Syria played a central transit role in international trade in the Middle Ages. Early into their rule, the Mamluks sought to expand their role in foreign trade, and to this end Baybars signed a commercial treaty with Genoa, while Qalawun signed a similar agreement with Ceylon. By the 15th century, internal upheaval as a result on Mamluk power struggles, diminishing iqtaʿ revenues as a result of plagues, and the encroachment of abandoned farmlands by Bedouin tribes led to a financial crisis in the sultanate. To make up for these losses, the Mamluks applied a three-pronged approach: taxation of the urban middle classes, increasing the production and sale of cotton and sugar to Europe, and taking advantage of their transit position in the trade between the Far East and Europe. The latter proved to be the most profitable method and was done by cultivating trade relationships with Venetia, Genoa and Barcelona, and increasing taxes on commodities. Thus, during the 15th century, the long-established trade between Europe and the Islamic world began to make up a significant part of the sultanate's revenues as the Mamluks imposed taxes on the merchants who operated or passed through the sultanate's ports.

Mamluk Egypt was a major producer of textiles and a supplier of raw materials for Western Europe. However, the frequent outbreaks of the Black Plague led to a decline in the Mamluk territories' production of goods such as textiles, silk products, sugar, glass, soaps, and paper, which coincided with the Europeans' increasing production of these goods. Trade continued nonetheless and despite papal restrictions on trade with the Muslims during the Crusades. Mediterranean trade was dominated by spices, such as pepper, muscat nuts and flowers, cloves and cinnamon, as well as medicinal drugs and indigo. These goods originated in Persia, India, and Southeast Asia and made their way to Europe via the Mamluk ports of Syria and Egypt. These ports were frequented by European merchants, who in turn sold gold and silver ducats and bullion, silk, wool and linen fabrics, furs, wax, honey, and cheeses.

Under Sultan Barsbay, a state monopoly was established on luxury goods, namely spices, in which the state set prices and collected a percentage of profits. To that end, in 1387, Barsbay established direct control over Alexandria, the principal Egyptian commercial port, thereby transferring the tax revenues of the port to the sultan's personal treasury (diwan al-khass) instead of the imperial treasury which was linked with the military's iqtaʿ system. Furthermore, in 1429, he ordered that the spice trade to Europe be conducted through Cairo before goods reached Alexandria, thus attempting to end the direct transportation of spices from the Red Sea to Alexandria. In the late 15th and early 16th centuries, the Portuguese Empire's expansion into Africa and Asia began to significantly decrease the revenues of the Mamluk-Venetian monopoly on the trans-Mediterranean trade. This contributed to and coincided with the fall of the sultanate.

Culture

Art 

Mamluk decorative arts—especially enameled and gilded glass, inlaid metalwork, woodwork, and textiles—were prized around the Mediterranean as well as in Europe, where they had a profound impact on local production. For example, Mamluk glassware had an influence on the Venetian glass industry. Trade with Iran, India, and China was even more extensive, turning Mamluk cities into centers of both trade and consumption. Imported luxury goods from the east sometimes influenced local artistic vocabularies, as exemplified by the incorporation of Chinese motifs into both objects and architecture. The Mamluks themselves, as former slaves who rose through the ranks by their own efforts, were status-conscious patrons who commissioned luxury objects marked with emblems of their ownership. Architecture was the most significant form of Mamluk patronage and numerous artistic objects were commissioned to furnish Mamluk religious buildings, such as glass lamps, Qur'an manuscripts, brass candlesticks, and wooden minbars. Decorative motifs in one art form were often applied in other art forms, including architecture.

Patronage varied over time, but the two high points of the arts were the reigns of al-Nasir Muhammad and of Qaytbay. Some art forms also varied in importance over time. For example, enameled glassware was a prominent industry during the first half of the Mamluk period but declined significantly in the 15th century. Most of the surviving examples of carpets, by contrast, date from the end of the Mamluk period. Ceramic production was relatively less important overall, in part because Chinese porcelains were widely available.

In the art of manuscript decoration, the Qur'an was the book most commonly produced with a high degree of artistic elaboration. Cairo, Damascus, and Aleppo were among the main centers of manuscript production. Mamluk-period Qur'ans were richly illuminated and exhibit stylistic similarities with those produced under the contemporary Ilkhanids in Iran. The production of high-quality paper at this time also allowed for pages to be larger, which in turn encouraged artists to elaborate new motifs and designs to fill these larger formats. Some manuscripts could be monumental in size; for example, one Qur'an manuscript produced for Sultan Sha'ban measured between 75 and 105 centimetres tall. One of the stylistic features that distinguished Mamluk manuscript decoration was the presence of gilded foliate scrollwork over pastel-coloured backgrounds set within wide margins. Frontispieces were often decorated with star-shaped or hexagonal geometric motifs.

Metalware, whether in the form of ewers, basins, or candlesticks, was widely used in various contexts and many examples have survived today. They were made of brass or bronze with inlaid decoration, though in the later periods decoration was often engraved rather than inlaid. The quality and quantity of metalwork was also generally higher in the early period. One of the best examples of this period is the so-called Baptistère of Saint-Louis (kept at the Louvre today), a large brass basin inlaid with arabesques and horizontal scenes of animals, hunters, and riders playing polo. An excellent example of the later period is a series of candlesticks commissioned by Qaytbay for Muhammad's tomb in the Prophet's Mosque in Medina. They are made of engraved brass, with black bitumen filling parts of the surfaces in order to create contrast with the motifs in polished brass. Their decoration consists almost entirely of Arabic calligraphy, with the thuluth script prominently used.

Glass lamps were another high point of Mamluk art, particularly those commissioned for mosques. Egypt and Syria already possessed a rich tradition of glassmaking prior to this period and Damascus was the most important production center during the Mamluk period. Coloured glass had been common in the preceding Ayyubid period, but during the Mamluk period enamel and gilding became the most important techniques of decorating glass. Mosque lamps had a bulbous body with a wide flaring neck at the top. They were produced in the thousands and suspended from the ceiling by chains.

Architecture 

Mamluk architecture is distinguished in part by the construction of multi-functional buildings whose floor plans became increasingly creative and complex due to the limited available space in the city and the desire to make monuments visually dominant in their urban surroundings. While Cairo was the main center of patronage, Mamluk architecture also appears in other cities of their realm such as Damascus, Jerusalem, Aleppo, and Medina. Patrons, including sultans and high-ranking emirs, typically set out to build mausoleums for themselves but attached to them various charitable structures such as madrasas, khanqahs, sabils, or mosques. The revenues and expenses of these charitable complexes were governed by inalienable waqf agreements that also served the secondary purpose of ensuring some form of income or property for the patrons' descendants.

The cruciform or four-iwan floor plan was adopted for madrasas and became more common for new monumental complexes than the traditional hypostyle mosque, although the vaulted iwans of the early period were replaced with flat-roofed iwans in the later period. The decoration of monuments also became more elaborate over time, with stone-carving and colored marble paneling and mosaics (including ablaq) replacing stucco as the most dominant architectural decoration. Monumental decorated entrance portals became common compared to earlier periods, often carved with muqarnas. Influences from the Syrian region, Ilkhanid Iran, and possibly even Venice were evident in these trends. Minarets, which were also elaborate, usually consisted of three tiers separated by balconies, with each tier having a different design than the others. Late mamluk minarets, for example, most typically had an octagonal shaft for the first tier, a round shaft on the second, and a lantern structure with finial on the third level. Domes also transitioned from wooden or brick structures, sometimes of bulbous shape, to pointed stone domes with complex geometric or arabesque motifs carved into their outer surfaces. The peak of this stone dome architecture was achieved under the reign of Qaytbay in the late 15th century.

After the Ottoman conquest of 1517, new Ottoman-style buildings were introduced, however the Mamluk style continued to be repeated or combined with Ottoman elements in many subsequent monuments. Some building types which first appeared in the late Mamluk period, such as sabil-kuttabs (a combination of sabil and kuttab) and multi-storied caravanserais (wikalas or khans), actually grew in number during the Ottoman period. In modern times, from the late 19th century onwards, a "neo-Mamluk" style also appeared, partly as a nationalist response against Ottoman and European styles, in an effort to promote local "Egyptian" styles.

List of sultans

See also
Furusiyya
Egypt in the Middle Ages
List of Sunni Muslim dynasties

References

Bibliography

Primary sources
Abu al-Fida, The Concise History of Humanity
 Al-Maqrizi, Al Selouk Leme'refatt Dewall al-Melouk, Dar al-kotob, 1997.
 Idem in English: Bohn, Henry G., The Road to Knowledge of the Return of Kings, Chronicles of the Crusades, AMS Press, 1969.
 Al-Maqrizi, al-Mawaiz wa al-'i'tibar bi dhikr al-khitat wa al-'athar, Matabat aladab, Cairo 1996, 
 Idem in French: Bouriant, Urbain, Description topographique et historique de l'Egypte, Paris 1895.
Ibn Taghribirdi, al-Nujum al-Zahirah Fi Milook Misr wa al-Qahirah, al-Hay'ah al-Misreyah 1968
 Idem in English: History of Egypt, by Yusef. William Popper, translator Abu L-Mahasin ibn Taghri Birdi, University of California Press 1954.
Ibn Iyas, and Gaston Wiet, translator, Journal d'un Bourgeois du Caire. Paris: 1955.

Further reading

 
Medieval Cairo
Medieval Egypt
Medieval Israel
Former countries in Africa
Former countries in Western Asia
States and territories established in 1250
States and territories disestablished in 1517
13th-century establishments in Africa
16th-century disestablishments in Africa
Medieval Libya
Medieval Jordan
Medieval Lebanon
Medieval Syria
Historical transcontinental empires
Former sultanates